The 1978 Individual Long Track World Championship was the eighth edition of the FIM speedway Individual Long Track World Championship. The event was held on 10 September 1978 in Mühldorf, West Germany.

The world title was won by Egon Müller of West Germany for third time after he defeated Alois Wiesböck in a run off for the gold medal. Ivan Mauger was unbeaten in his first four rides but then suffered engine problems and Peter Collins would have won the title but in his last race his chain broke and he had to push his bike over the line for one point.

Final Classification 

 ef = engine failure
 ns = Non starter
 x = excluded

Run Off 
Gold medal - Müller beat Wiesböck
Bronze medal - Collins beat Mauger

References 

1978
Sport in West Germany
Sports competitions in West Germany
Speedway competitions in Germany
Motor
Motor